This is a list of the seaports of England and Wales, clockwise, starting from the Scottish border.

Major operators
Five companies own the many of the largest of UK ports: Associated British Ports (ABP), Forth Ports, Hutchison Port Holdings (HPH), Peel Group and PD Ports’ meanwhile the largest independent trust ports are Aberdeen, Belfast, Blyth, Dover, London and Milford Haven. 

All of these port operators are members of the British Ports Association, the national trade body for ports and harbours.

Major ports
Listed clockwise around the English coast from the Scottish border.

North-eastern England
Berwick-upon-Tweed
Blyth
Bridlington
Hartlepool
Redcar
Scarborough
Seaham
Sunderland Docks, Sunderland
Teesport, Middlesbrough
Port of Tyne, South Shields
Warkworth
Whitby

Humber
Goole
Grimsby
Port of Hull, Kingston upon Hull
Port of Immingham, Immingham

The Wash and East Anglia
Boston
Port of Felixstowe, Felixstowe
Fosdyke
Great Yarmouth Outer Harbour, Great Yarmouth
Harwich International Port, Harwich
Port of Ipswich, Ipswich
King's Lynn
Port of Lowestoft, Lowestoft
Mistley
Southwold
Sutton Bridge
Wells-next-the-Sea
Port of Wisbech, Wisbech

Thames Estuary and Kent
Brightlingsea
Rochford, River Roach, Wallasea Island
Port of London (includes Port of Tilbury)
Sheerness
Whitstable
Sandwich
Port of Ramsgate
Port of Dover, Dover
Folkestone
Rye Harbour

South Coast (including Isle of Wight)
Newhaven
Shoreham-by-Sea
Portsmouth International Port, Portsmouth
Newport, Isle of Wight
Port of Southampton, Southampton
Cowes
Lymington

West Country
Port of Poole
Portland Harbour
Bridport Harbour, Bridport
Exmouth
Teignmouth
Torquay
Brixham
Dartmouth
Plymouth
Fowey
Par
Charlestown
Penryn
Falmouth Docks, Falmouth
Gweek
Porthoustock
Newlyn
Penzance
Hugh Town
St Ives, Cornwall
Padstow
Appledore, Torridge, Devon

Bristol Channel (England)
Avonmouth Docks, Avonmouth
Barnstaple
Bideford
Port of Bridgwater, Bridgwater
Port of Bristol, Bristol
Sharpness
Watchet
Gloucester

Bristol Channel (Wales)
 Barry Docks, Barry
Burry Port
Cardiff Docks, Cardiff
Llanelli
Neath
Newport Docks, Newport
 Port of Port Talbot, Port Talbot
 Swansea Docks, Swansea

Wales (west and north)
 Aberdyfi
Aberystwyth
Caernarfon
Fishguard Harbour, Fishguard
Port of Holyhead, Holyhead
 Llandulas
 Milford Haven Port, Milford Haven
 Mostyn
 Pembroke Dock
 Port Penrhyn
 Shotton

Northwest England
Port of Barrow, Barrow-in-Furness
Birkenhead
Fleetwood
Port of Garston, Garston
Heysham Port, Heysham
Lancaster
Port of Liverpool, see also List of Liverpool Docks
Port of Manchester, Manchester
Maryport
Preston
Port Salford, Salford
Silloth
Whitehaven
Workington

References

See also
 List of ports and harbours in Scotland
 List of ports in Northern Ireland
 List of RNLI stations
 List of free ports#United Kingdom
 the Cinque Ports, and their Lord Warden
 List of vice-admirals of the coast
 List of Panamax ports#Great Britain
 List of busiest ports in Europe
 List of ferry operators#Europe
 List of ports
 List of ports and harbours of the Atlantic Ocean
 Canal & River Trust

Ports
 
 
England and Wales
 
Ports